Darin Todorov (born 4 December 1988) is a Bulgarian former footballer who played as a striker.

References

External links
 

1988 births
Living people
Bulgarian footballers
First Professional Football League (Bulgaria) players
PFC Spartak Varna players
Association football forwards
People from Shumen